This is the discography of English progressive rock band Camel.

Albums

Studio albums

Live albums

Compilation albums

Box sets

Video albums

Other albums

Singles

References

Discographies of British artists
Rock music group discographies